The 1923 season was the 4th season of competitive football in Poland.

National teams

Poland national team

Notes and references